Trachydrillia is a genus of sea snail marine gastropod mollusks in the family Clavatulidae.

Species
 Trachydrillia denizi (Nolf & Swinnen, 2010)

References

 Nolf F. & Swinnen F. (2010) A new genus and species of "Drillia-like" turrids (Mollusca: Gastropoda: Drilliidae) from Senegal. Neptunea 9(4): 17–22.